Samaipaticereus is a genus of cactus containing the sole species Samaipaticereus corroanus. It is known only from East Andean Bolivia and Peru.

References 

Trichocereeae
Cacti of South America
Endemic flora of Bolivia
Flora of the Andes
Monotypic Cactaceae genera